Edward Willis Levert (born June 16, 1942) is an American singer, best known as the lead vocalist of The O'Jays. He is the father of Gerald Levert (1966–2006) and Sean Levert (1968–2008).

Biography 
Levert was born in Bessemer, Alabama, but was raised in Canton, Ohio, where he moved at the age of six. He attended church regularly and eventually joined the church choir. As Levert continued singing into his teenage years, he became a recognized voice in the church choir, sang in school plays and performed regularly on a gospel radio show.

While at high school, he teamed up with classmates Walter Williams, William Powell, Bobby Massey and Bill Isles to form a group called the Triumphs. The Triumphs played locally in Canton opening for different acts, playing 'sock hops'. They traveled to Cincinnati to canvas King Records whose President Sid Nathan changed their name to The Mascots and signed them to his label. The Mascots' popularity grew as their music was broadcast on Cleveland radio stations.

In 1969, The O'Jays signed with Philadelphia International Records where they began to release records under the new label. The O'Jays later signed with EMI-Manhattan Records and Levert and Williams began co-writing and producing their own tracks. Their EMI debut album, "Let Me Touch You", went to number three R&B and included "Lovin' You", which became a number-one R&B hit in the summer of 1987.

In 1984, Levert's two sons Gerald and Sean, both still in high school, announced that they wanted to follow their father's musical background. They met Marc Gordon recording under the group name LeVert – four of their seven albums went platinum. In 1992 Eddie and son Gerald recorded "Baby Hold On to Me" which was a No. 1 R&B hit and reached No. 37 Pop on the charts.

In 2006, upon returning from a South African tour with sons Gerald and Sean, Eddie's son Gerald died due to interactions between his prescribed medications. In 2007, Eddie and son Gerald's album recorded in 2006, "Something to Talk About" was released followed by the publication of the book "I Got Your Back" co-authored by Eddie and son Gerald. In 2008, Eddie's son Sean died as a result of being denied needed prescription medication by government officials in Ohio. Later in 2008, Eddie and his late son Gerald were presented with "Best Duo or Group" Image Award. In 2009, The O'Jays were awarded BET's 'Lifetime Achievement Award' and Eddie Levert was awarded the "Heroes and Legends Pacesetter Award". On January 29, 2011, The O'Jays received the "Trumpet Lifetime Achievement Award". Throughout Eddie Levert's career, The O'Jays have released ten Gold Albums, with nine eventually going Platinum and ten No. 1 hits.

Levert is still performing and touring with The O'Jays well as performing as a solo artist.

Personal life 
Levert lives in Las Vegas with his wife Raquel and daughter Ryan. He is the third cousin of NBA player Caris LeVert.

Awards 

 4 Grammy Nominations
 4 American Music Award Nominations
 1990 American Music Award for "Best Duo" and "Best Group"
 NAACP Award for "Outstanding Vocal Group" in 1991
 Soul of America Award in 1993
 Award for "Lifetime Commitment to the Community for service and beautiful sounds that continue to change the face of music" from 100 Black Men (October 20, 2001)
 Award for "Supporting the UNCF", given to The O'Jays at the 18th Annual Mayor's Ball in Atlanta, Georgia (United Negro College Fund Mask Award) (December 15, 2001)
 Soul Train 2002 Quincy Jones Award for "Outstanding Career Achievement in the field of Entertainment"
 2003 Wall of Fame Honor in Canton, Ohio
 2003 State of Ohio for Outstanding Achievements
 2003 Mayors Citation from the City of Canton, Ohio
 2003 Honorary Sheriff conferred on The O'Jays by The city of New Orleans
 2004 Vocal Group Hall of Fame in Sharon, Pennsylvania
 2005 Rock and Roll Hall of Fame in Cleveland, Ohio
 2009 Black Entertainment Television Lifetime Achievement Award
 2011 Trumpet Lifetime Achievement Award

References 

1942 births
Living people
American soul singers
Musicians from Canton, Ohio
People from Bessemer, Alabama
Actors from Canton, Ohio
21st-century African-American male singers
20th-century African-American male singers